Route 7 is a state highway in the northern part of New Jersey in the United States. It has two sections, an east–west alignment running from U.S. Route 1/9 Truck in Jersey City to Route 21 in Belleville, and a north–south alignment running from the Newark/Belleville to the Nutley/Clifton border. The New Jersey Department of Transportation (NJDOT) lists Route 7 as a single north–south highway with a small gap between the alignments.

The southern section of Route 7, which runs from Jersey City to Belleville, passes through industrial areas, the New Jersey Meadowlands, Arlington Memorial Park, and some residential and business areas. West of the interchange with County Route 508 in Kearny, Route 7 is the Belleville Turnpike, a historic road created in 1759. The northern section of Route 7 runs north through residential and business areas of Belleville and Nutley into Clifton, where it turns west and crosses back into Nutley, briefly turning to the north to come to its northern terminus. A portion of the route in Nutley is municipally maintained while the portion within Clifton is maintained by Passaic County. The two separate sections of Route 7 are linked by County Route 506 (Rutgers Street) in Belleville, which is signed as Route 7 despite the fact it is not officially part of the route.

Route 7 was established in 1927 to run from Jersey City to Paterson, replacing pre-1927 Route 11 between Belleville and Paterson. The routing was amended in 1929 to head to Route 3 in Wallington and was extended north to Route 6 (now U.S. Route 46) in East Paterson in 1949. In 1953, the route was modified to follow its current alignment.

Route description

Southern section

The first section of Route 7 begins at an intersection with U.S. Route 1-9 Truck and County Route 645 (Charlotte Avenue) in Jersey City, Hudson County, heading to the west on a four-lane highway that is signed east–west. The route crosses the Hackensack River on the Wittpenn Bridge parallel to Conrail Shared Assets Operations' Passaic and Harsimus Line into Kearny. Route 7 interchanges with County Route 659 (Fish House Road) and widens to a six-lane divided highway. The route then passes by industrial areas and a Conrail Shared Assets Operations railroad yard before it passes over NJ Transit's Morris & Essex Lines and reaches an interchange with County Route 508. Past this interchange, Route 7 becomes the four-lane, divided Belleville Turnpike, with the eastern end of the Newark Turnpike running in the division between the two sides of Route 7. It then becomes an undivided two-lane road, heading northwest, narrowing to two lanes before it crosses under Amtrak's Northeast Corridor and passes through the New Jersey Meadowlands. The route crosses under the Eastern Spur of the New Jersey Turnpike (Interstate 95) and then the Western Spur of the turnpike a short distance later before passing over Norfolk Southern's Boonton Line.

Route 7 continues northwest, widens, with a painted median, as it passes through two large cemeteries on the border of Hudson County (Kearny) to the south and Bergen County (North Arlington) to the north, though the route itself is signed north–south along that border.

After an intersection with Schuyler Avenue (which runs as Hudson County Route 507 to the south of Route 7 and Bergen County Route 130 to the north of Route 7), the road turns NNW, narrowing again to two lanes undivided. In this portion of the route, it had a concurrency with County Route 507 (both Bergen and Hudson counties). It keeps this configuration for about a half mile, as it still runs along the Kearny/North Arlington border. At that point, it meets the southern terminus of Route 17 (Ridge Road) and the northern terminus of County Route 697 (Kearny Avenue).

Past this intersection, County Route 507 turns away from Route 7, becoming concurrent with Route 17. by heading north on River Road, while Route 7 continues along Belleville Turnpike for another half mile, Route 7 continues another half mile west, crossing the Passaic River on a lift bridge, known as the Belleville Turnpike Bridge or Rutgers Street Bridge, into Belleville, Essex County, where the local street name changes from Belleville Turnpike to Rutgers Street. The first section of Route 7 ends at an intersection with Main Street underneath the Route 21 freeway.

Gap in the route

The intersection of Main St and Rutgers Street in Belleville forms the end of one section of Route 7 (signed north, directionally west). Rutgers Street is named for Colonel Henry Rutgers, an American Revolutionary War hero and benefactor of what is now Rutgers University. For its entire length, Rutgers carries Essex County Route 506, which ends, like Rutgers Street itself, at the Rutgers Street Bridge.

Prior to turning onto Rutgers Street, CR-506 runs along Washington Street concurrent with the northern section of Route 7. Though the northern section of Route 7 begins a few blocks south, it is not readily recognized (minimal signing). As CR-506 runs concurrently with it here, and then turns down Rutgers for the short distance that bridges the gap between the two Route 7 sections, Rutgers/506 is often viewed as if it continues Route 7, while the short portion of the northern section that lies south of Rutgers is sometimes seen as a spur, even though it is part of the main route.

Rutgers' identity has become so closely aligned with Route 7, that though it is not officially part of Route 7, Rutgers, from Washington Avenue to Main Street, is signed as if it is part of Route 7.

Northern section 

The second section of Route 7, designated a north–south road, heads north on Washington Avenue from the Second River crossing on the Newark/Belleville border, passing through a business district. The route intersects County Route 506 (Belleville Avenue), and that county route then forms a concurrency with Route 7 along the next block of Washington Avenue, to the intersection with Rutgers Street. At that point, County Route 506 heads to the east, ending at the intersection of Main Street, Rutgers Street, and bridge to Belleville (which is also the other section of Route 7).

Route 7 is not signed on Washington Avenue between the Second River bridge and Rutgers Street, except on some overhead signs suspended from traffic signals.

From the Rutgers Street intersection, Route 7 continues along Washington Avenue for about a mile and a half before reaching Nutley, still continuing on Washington Avenue into Nutley. The road crosses Norfolk Southern's Newark Industrial Track line at an intersection with County Route 648 (Centre Street). At the intersection with County Route 646 (Park Avenue), Route 7 turns into a municipally maintained road and enters a more residential area. Upon intersecting County Route 606 (Kingsland Road), Route 7 crosses into Clifton, Passaic County and heads to the west on county-maintained Kingsland Street signed east–west. Kingsland, carrying Route 7, crosses back into Nutley, regaining state maintenance. When Kingsland becomes County Route 644 at the intersection with Cathedral Avenue, Route 7 turns north from Kingsland onto Cathedral Avenue and comes to its terminus at Orange Street in Nutley. However, signage continues to indicate Route 7 up to the terminus of Cathedral Avenue at interchange with Route 3 at the intersection of Cathedral Avenue, Passaic Avenue, and Ward Avenue. Per NJDOT traffic regulations, the portion of Cathedral Avenue and Passaic Avenue within the vicinity of the Route 3 interchange in Clifton is under state jurisdiction.

History

The Belleville Turnpike, which is the majority of the southern portion of Route 7, was created in 1759 as a turnpike made out of cedar logs. This road was chartered in 1808. It served as a part of the Underground Railroad route for escaped slaves to get to Jersey City. The road west of modern County Route 508 was later incorporated into the William Penn Highway, which ran from Jersey City to Pittsburgh, PA. 
The northern segment of Route 7 was originally a part of pre-1927 Route 11, which was legislated in 1917 to run from Newark to Paterson. In the 1927 New Jersey state highway renumbering, Route 7 was designated to run from Jersey City to Paterson, replacing pre-1927 Route 11 between Belleville and Paterson.

In 1929, the routing was amended to run from Route 25 (now U.S. Route 1/9 Truck) in Jersey City to Route 3 in Wallington. Route 7 was extended north in 1949 to continue to Route 6 (now U.S. Route 46) in East Paterson (now Elmwood Park).
In the 1953 New Jersey state highway renumbering, Route 7 was legislated onto its current alignment, with the northern terminus moved to the Nutley/Clifton border. The route was also realigned to head south on Washington Avenue between the Newark border and Rutgers Street in Belleville on what was Route 11N, a remnant of pre-1927 Route 11, making Route 7 discontinuous. County Route 506 used to follow the southern portion of Route 7 but has been truncated to the intersection with Routes 7 and 21 in Belleville.

Major intersections

See also

References

External links

 New Jersey Roads: Route 7
 New Jersey Highway Ends: Route 7
 An expanded view of road jurisdiction near the confluence of US 46, I-95 / NJTurnpike, I 280, NJ 7 and CR 508 in Kearny
 Speed Limits for Route 7

007
Transportation in Bergen County, New Jersey
Transportation in Essex County, New Jersey
Transportation in Hudson County, New Jersey
Transportation in Passaic County, New Jersey